Bartholomew Teeling (  – 24 September 1798) was an Irish military officer and nationalist who was leader of the rebel forces during the Irish Rebellion of 1798 and who carried out an act of bravery during the Battle of Collooney. He was captured at the Battle of Ballinamuck and subsequently executed for treason.

Early life

Bartholomew Teeling was born  in Lisburn, County Antrim, the son of a wealthy Catholic linen manufacturer. Growing up, Teeling was educated at the Dubordieu School in Lisburn. His younger brother Charles went on to be a writer. In 1795, the two brothers joined the Society of United Irishmen and helped cement the organisation's alliance with the Defenders. In County Down, their brother-in-law, John Magennis, was the "Grand Master" of the Defenders. In 1796, Batholomew travelled to France to encourage support for a French invasion of Ireland.

Irish Rebellion of 1798

Landing at Killala

In 1798, the Irish Rebellion of 1798 against British rule in Ireland broke out. Teeling returned to Ireland on 22 August 1798, as an aide-de-camp to General Jean Humbert, and landed at Killala Bay between County Sligo and Mayo with a force of French troops. On 28 August, Humbert's men captured Castlebar and the United Irishmen subsequently established the Republic of Connacht. Humbert's troops, having combined forces with local rebels, pushed east through County Sligo but were halted by a cannon which government forces had installed above Union Rock near Collooney.

Battle of Collooney

On 5 September 1798, Teeling participated in the Battle of Collooney. He cleared the way for a Franco-Irish victory by single-handedly disabling the cannon installed at Union Rock during the battle after breaking from the French ranks and galloping towards the enemy armed with a pistol. Teeling killed the gunner manning the cannon and captured it, allowing the combined Franco-Irish force to advance and forcing their opponents to retreat towards their barracks in Sligo, having suffered 60 men killed and 100 captured.

Battle of Ballinamuck and execution

During the Battle of Ballinamuck, which was fought near Longford, Teeling and approximately 500 other Irishmen were captured along with their French allies. The French were treated by the Dublin Castle administration as prisoners of war and were eventually returned to France, but the Irish prisoners were executed. Teeling was court-martialled after his capture. To positively identify him, the authorities enlisted William Coulson, a damask manufacturer from Lisburn, who identified him as a son of Luke Teeling, a linen merchant who lived in Chapel Hill, Lisburn. Teeling was hanged at Arbour Hill Prison in Dublin.

Teeling attempted to read the following statement from the scaffold, but was not permitted to:

He is believed to have been buried at the mass grave of rebels at Croppies' Acre, Dublin.

Statue of Teeling
In 1898, the centenary year of the battle, a statue of Teeling was erected in Carricknagat. One of the main streets in Sligo Town, which accommodates the Sligo Courthouse and main Garda Síochána barracks was later named Teeling Street also in honour of Bartholomew Teeling.

References

1774 births
1798 deaths
Executed Irish people
Irish republicans
People from Lisburn
People executed by the British military by hanging
People executed by the Kingdom of Great Britain
People executed for treason
United Irishmen